Breece Hall (born May 31, 2001) is an American football running back for the New York Jets of the National Football League (NFL). He played college football at Iowa State, where he was a two-time All-American and Big 12 Offensive Player of the Year. Hall was drafted by the Jets in the second round of the 2022 NFL Draft.

Early life and high school
Hall grew up in Wichita, Kansas and attended Wichita Northwest High School. Hall was named first-team All-Metro and first-team All-State after rushing for 2,082 yards and scoring 36 total touchdowns in his junior season. As a senior, Hall rushed for 2,127 yards and 29 touchdowns and was again named first-team All-State and the Wichita Metro Player of the Year.

College career
Following the departure of David Montgomery for the NFL, Hall became Iowa State's starting running back during his true freshman season. He was named the co-Newcomer of the Week after rushing 132 yards and three touchdowns 38–14 win over West Virginia. Hall repeated as Newcomer of the Week the following week after rushing for 183 yards and two touchdowns while also catching three passes for 73 yards. He finished the season with 897 rushing yards and nine touchdowns while also catching 23 passes for 252 yards and one touchdown and was named second-team All-Big 12.

Hall rushed for over 100 yards in eight straight games to start his sophomore season. Hall finished the season as the FBS leader in rushing yards with 1,572 on 279 carries and 21 rushing touchdowns while also catching 23 passes for 180 yards and two touchdowns. Hall was named first-team All-Big 12 and the conference Offensive Player of the Year and became the first unanimous first-team All-American in school history.

As a junior in 2021, Hall finished with 1,472 rushing yards, 302 receiving yards, and 23 total touchdowns. Following the season, Hall announced that he would forgo his senior year and enter the 2022 NFL Draft.

College statistics

Professional career

Hall was drafted by the New York Jets in the second round with the 36th overall pick in the 2022 NFL Draft, which made him the first running back selected that year.

Hall made his NFL debut in Week 1 of the 2022 season against the Baltimore Ravens. He scored his first professional touchdown on a ten-yard reception from quarterback Joe Flacco in Week 2 against the Cleveland Browns. During Week 5 against the Miami Dolphins, Hall finished with 97 rushing yards, 100 receiving yards, and a touchdown as the Jets won 40–17. For his performance on Week 6 against Green Bay, with 20 carriers for 116 yards, 2 receptions for 5 yards and a rushing touchdown, Hall was named FedEx Ground Player and Pepsi NFL rookie of the week.

In Week 7 against the Denver Broncos, Hall rushed for 72 yards and a touchdown, but tore his ACL and meniscus in the second quarter in the 16–9 win. He was placed on injured reserve on October 25, 2022, ending his season.

Personal life
Hall has multiple family ties to professional football. His step-father, Jeff Smith, played for the Chiefs and Buccaneers over a four year NFL career. His cousin, Kenton Keith, had a brief stint in 2004 with the Jets who would go on to become Hall's team, as well as a season with the Colts in 2007. He also spent six seasons in the CFL. Hall’s most notable family member however, is his third cousin, three-time Superbowl champion, Roger Craig, who played running back most notably for the San Francisco 49ers in the 1980s.

NFL career statistics

References

External links
 
 New York Jets bio
 Iowa State Cyclones bio

2001 births
Living people
American football running backs
Iowa State Cyclones football players
Players of American football from Wichita, Kansas
All-American college football players
African-American players of American football
21st-century African-American sportspeople
New York Jets players